Illicit trade is the production or distribution of a good or service that is considered illegal by a legislature. It includes trade that is strictly illegal in different jurisdictions, as well as trade that is illegal in some jurisdictions but legal in others.

Illicit trade can occur either in black markets or in legitimate markets. Some of the most important types of illicit trade  include various forms of smuggling, the  illegal drug trade, counterfeiting, human trafficking, the illicit tobacco trade, arms trafficking, illicit trafficking of cultural property, and various environmental crimes such as  illegal wildlife trade, illegal logging and illegal fishing.

International initiatives to combat illicit trade 
While there are several international treaties for dealing with specific types of illicit trade, it is said that a cross-sector approach as well as increased collaboration  and communication between stakeholders are necessary to address illicit trade more efficiently.

In 2013, the OECD launched a Task Force Countering on Illicit Trade, which focuses on developing evidence-based research and coordinating international expertise in quantifying and mapping illicit markets.

Since 2013, The World Customs Organization produces a yearly report on illicit trade  which  uses seizure data and case studies to study illicit trade flows.

In February 2020, UNCTAD held a Forum on illicit trade. One of the main focus  of the event was to evaluate how  illicit trade impacts negatively the Sustainable Development Goals.

According to the Global Initiative Against Transnational Organized Crime and to Tradeslab, not only the World Trade Organization has rather limited tools to deal with illicit trade, but it may also limit the ability of states to combat it.

Measurements on illicit trade 
By considering 12 different illicit markets, Global Financial Integrity estimated the value of illicit trade at $650 billion in 2011.

The UNODC estimated in 2012 that the illicit trade activities of  transnational organized crime have a combined  annual value of $870 billion per year.

The Economist Intelligence Unit developed in 2018 a Global Illicit Trade Index, which evaluates  the structural capacities of 84 countries  to fight illicit trade.

Debates and controversies 
Several authors and organizations assert that globalization has led to a significant increase of illicit trade, and that it has become a significant global threat. However, some authors argue that illicit trade has not necessarily grown in proportion to licit trade,  and that an historical perspective is missing in the current assessment of its importance.

References 

Organized crime
Corruption